Stéphane Pocrain (born 27 November 1972) is a French politician and television journalist.

He was born in Paris on 27 November 1972. His parents came from Guadeloupe.

He was a candidate for an ecologist movement in 2002's elections in Orsay.

He created, in 2005, the CRAN (Conseil Représentatif des Associations Noires de France) with Manu Dibango, Louis-Georges Tin, and Fodé Sylla.

References

1972 births
Living people
Writers from Paris
French people of Guadeloupean descent
Ecology Generation politicians
The Greens (France) politicians
Socialist Party (France) politicians
French television journalists